Westborough is an electoral ward of Southend-on-Sea covering the urban area of Westcliff-on-Sea.

Councillors

 Indicates Councillor elected that year.

Elections

Elections in the 2010s

No Independent (−22.1) or UKIP (−12.9) candidates as previous.

References

Electoral wards of Southend-on-Sea